Carlos Eugenio Júnior Tavares dos Santos (born 7 August 1996), known as Júnior Tavares, is a Brazilian professional footballer who plays as a left-back and defensive midfielder for Ponte Preta.

Títulos
 Seleção Brasileira
 Campeonato Sul-Americano Sub-15: 2011

 São Paulo

Florida Cup: 2017

Náutico
 Campeonato Pernambucano: 2022

Prêmios Individuais
 Seleção do Campeonato Pernambucano: 2022

Club career
In 2016, Tavares was loaned to São Paulo, where he played several championships for the under 20 team. After standing out, it was bought in definitive and was promoted to the professional team of São Paulo.

On 16 July 2018, Tavares signed to Serie A side Sampdoria on loan until 30 June 2019 with an option to buy.

Career statistics

References

External links
globoesporte.com

1998 births
Living people
Brazilian footballers
Brazil under-20 international footballers
Brazil youth international footballers
Association football defenders
Campeonato Brasileiro Série A players
Campeonato Brasileiro Série B players
Serie A players
Primeira Liga players
Grêmio Foot-Ball Porto Alegrense players
Joinville Esporte Clube players
São Paulo FC players
U.C. Sampdoria players
Portimonense S.C. players
Sport Club do Recife players
Clube Náutico Capibaribe players
Associação Atlética Ponte Preta players
Footballers from Porto Alegre
Brazilian expatriate footballers
Brazilian expatriate sportspeople in Italy
Expatriate footballers in Italy
Expatriate footballers in Portugal